The 1976 Skate Canada International was held in Ottawa, Ontario. Medals were awarded in the disciplines of men's singles, ladies' singles, and ice dancing.

Results

Men

Ladies

Ice dancing

References

Skate Canada International, 1976
Skate Canada International
1976 in Canadian sports 
1976 in Ontario